Nimravides is a genus of extinct saber-toothed cats that lived in North America during the Late Miocene, between 10.3 and 5.332 Ma. Despite its scientific name, Nimravides does not belong to the Nimravidae, but is a true cat, belonging to the family Felidae. It was also possessed of long, powerful legs and a long back. For many decades, it was also believed to be a member of the genus Machairodus, but, despite the similarities between them at first glance, based on autapomorphies in the skeleton, the two animals are too different to be classified as species of the same genus, and thus, Nimravides remains separate as its own genus within the Homotherini. 

Evidence published in November, 2022 suggests Nimravides was endemic to North America and that when the Machairodus-Amphimachairodus lineage emigrated to North America from Eurasia, differing aspects of their cranial anatomy allowed the newly arrived machairodont genera to survive a faunal change occurring during the earl-late Hemphilian stage of the Miocene Epoch some 6.5 million years ago. The analysis also determined that the Machairodus-Amphimachairodus lineage did not have a competitive edge over Nimravides, implying that neither newcomer or endemic species were superior to one another in regards to hunting adaptations.

References

External links
Nimravides galiani
Nimravides thinobates
Nimravides hibbardi
Nimravides pedionomus

Homotherini
Miocene carnivorans
Prehistoric carnivoran genera
Miocene mammals of North America